When Luxembourg was invaded and annexed by Nazi Germany in 1940, a national consciousness started to come about. From 1941 onwards, the first resistance groups, such as the Letzeburger Ro'de Lé'w or the PI-Men, were founded. Operating underground, they secretly worked against the German occupation, helping to bring political refugees and those trying to avoid being conscripted into the German forces across the border, and put out patriotic leaflets (often depicting Grand Duchess Charlotte) encouraging the population of Luxembourg to pull through.

As with other countries, the origins, ideological and otherwise, of the different Resistance groups were varied: it ranged from those who found Nazi ideology itself worth fighting against, to those who valued first and foremost their country's freedom. The political spectrum ranged from the communists to clerical-conservative elements (including even some anti-Semitic undertones).

Luxemburgish Resistance groups
Christian, liberal and patriotic groups (NS-designation: "Reaktion"):

Unio'n vun de Lëtzebuerger Fräiheetsorganisatiounen (Unio'n), 1944:

• Lëtzeburger Patriote Liga (LPL), 1940

• Lëtzebuerger Legio'n (LL), 1940 → Letzeburger Volleks-Legio'n (LVL), 1941

• Trei Lëtzeburger Studenten (TLS), 1941

• Lëtzebuerger Scouten ≈ Lëtzeburger Freihéts-Kämpfer (LFK), 1940

• Lëtzeburger Ro'de Lé'w, 1941

• Lëtzeburger Freihéts-Bond ≈ Lëtzeburger Freihéts-Bewegong (LFB), 1940

• Patriotes Indépendants ("PI-Men"), 1940

Communist and international-socialist groups (NS-designation: "Rotfront"):

• Aktiv Letzeburger Enhétsfront ge'nt de Faschismus (ALEF), 1940

• Kommunistesche Kampfgrupp Schëffleng ("Alweraje"), 1941

After the war, the LPPD was formed, an umbrella group of the Resistance.

Organisation

In parallel with individual acts of protest, the summer of 1940 saw the first attempts to organise resistance to the German occupation on a more permanent level. From August, the heads of the Catholic Scouts in the south of the country met in Esch-sur-Alzette and decided to engage in resistance against the Germans. Similar meetings later took place in Luxembourg city, Diekirch and Wiltz. When the occupiers banned the Scout movement in Luxembourg, the organisation continued to exist underground, under the name Lëtzebuerger Scouten an der Resistenz (LS).

In late September, Raymond Petit, a student at the Lycée of Echternach, founded the group LPL, the Lëtzebuerger Patriote-Liga. Similarly, at the Lycée of Diekirch, Camille Sutor founded the Trei Lëtzeburger Studenten (TLS). The Lëtzebuerger Legioun (LL) was founded on 27 October 1940 by Aloyse Raths, a student at the École normale, in his native village of Bissen. In November 1940 a retired customs officer, Alphonse Rodesch, founded a second movement with the name LPL in Clervaux, referring to the World War I movement of that name. In December 1940, Hubert Glesener, Eduard Heyardt and Pierre Fonck formed the LFB (Lëtzebuerger Fräiheets-Bewegong) in Rumelange: this organisation included Catholics, liberals and communists. Until the summer of 1941 other movements were formed around the country: in Bascharage, Albert Meyers founded the Lëtzebuerger Roude Léif (LRL); in Differdange, Tétange and Rumelange the LFK (Lëtzebuerger Fräiheets-Kämpfer) and in Schifflange the "ALWERAJE" were formed. In Differdange, Josy Goerres created the Patriotes Indépendants ("Pi-Men"). Another LFB group, the Lëtzebuerger Fräiheets- Bond, was formed in Dudelange.

All these groups quickly entered into contact with one another, and several mergers soon took place. First, the TLS merged with the LL, then in June 1941, the LS and LL merged to form the LVL (Lëtzebuerger Volleks-Légioun). On the other hand, an attempt at cooperation between the LFK and LFB in Rumelange ended in betrayal and hundreds of arrests. Further arrests from November 1941 onwards decimated various Resistance groups, with the result that the LVL, the LPL and the LRL became the most substantial remaining organisations, attracting the surviving members of the defunct groups.

The only political party to continue to operate underground was the Luxembourgish Communist Party. However, in August 1942 a police raid weakened Communist resistance, and the schoolteacher François Frisch, who was close to the Communist politician Dominique Urbany, founded a new movement, the ALEF (the Aktiv Lëtzebuerger Eenheetsfront géint de Faschismus).

From 1943 at the latest, Resistance members recognised a need to unify the various organisations. Already in October 1941, attempts had been made to coordinate the different groups' activities against the introduction of mandatory military service. But it was not until after the wave of arrests in 1943 and the executions in February 1944 that the Unio'n vun de Letzeburger Freihétsorganisatio'nen was created on 23 March 1944, uniting the LPL, LRL, and LVL, after long and difficult negotiations. Although the LFB was also a part of these negotiations, it chose not to join the Unio'n. The Unio'n was headed by a central committee composed of two delegates from each of the 3 member organisations.

Multiple "Resistances" 

"The Resistance" never existed as a unified entity, instead resistance was constituted into several separate Resistance organisations. The war did not unify the country any more than it had been previously, although more people became conscious of their national identity, and several collective victories, such as the strike of 1942 and the failed referendum of 1941 proved that cooperation was possible. The Resistance was above all a regional phenomenon: each organisation had its geographical base, and none operated across the whole country.

Politically, two tendencies in the Resistance can be distinguished, one left-wing (including the Communist Party of Luxembourg) and one right-wing (LVL, LPL Clervaux, Unio'n). There were also organisations that had no particular political programme, which mostly occupied themselves with practical matters; as well as a large number of resistants who were not affiliated to any organisation.

The Communist Party of Luxembourg (PCL) hesitated for a long time before taking up hostilities against the German occupier, due to its loyalty to the Soviet Union, which itself was not at war with Germany until June 1941. From May 1942, the PCL advocated the policy of the popular front against the fascists, but also continued to have other political goals in mind, and saw the social democrats as a political rival. The Communists saw the fight against the German occupiers as merely the first step towards a radical change of the social and political landscape.

The PCL was not the only organisation whose political goals kept it from cooperating with other groups. The admission policy of the LVL stated that membership was forbidden to anyone who was a communist or a "drunkard". The right-wing Resistance groups were generally to be found in the north, based among rural communities. Religious motivations were a significant factor for them, and they followed a "Marian cult" devoted to Grand Duchess Charlotte.

At the same time, the LVL adopted the anti-Semitism of the Nazi occupiers, and the Unio'n called for a Lebensraum (living space) for the Luxembourgish people in terms very similar to those found in Mein Kampf.

For the organised Resistance, the prime motivating factor appears to have been not a desire for liberty or a democratic ideal, but nationalism, albeit influenced by socialism for those on the left, or by anti-parliamentary corporatism on the right. If there was one characteristic which was common to all Resistance movements, then, whether on the left or the right, it was this nationalism. This becomes apparent in the Resistance organisations' interpretation of history: an emphasis on the "Luxembourgish" emperors of the Holy Roman Empire, a glorification of John the Blind and the participants in the peasant war known as the Kleppelkrich, attacks on the "foreign domination" from 1443 to 1839.

Activities

The activities of the Resistance, as described in a Gestapo report from 1941, consisted of illegal meetings, propaganda activities, printing flyers, procuring weapons and explosives, supporting family members of arrested persons, organising illegal emigration and joining other countries' armed forces.

Underground press 
As elsewhere in German-occupied Europe, the underground press was an important part of resistance activity in Luxembourg. Mainly, the resistors' aim was to counteract the German propaganda that portrayed Luxembourg as an integral part of Germany, under the dictum Heim ins Reich. To this end, they printed flyers by hand or on machines, which were distributed to friends, colleagues and on the street, to spread counter-propaganda and to firm up Luxembourgers' patriotism. From February 1941, the communist Resistance started publishing the newspaper entitled Die Wahrheit. Together with the 19 editions of Ons Zeidong produced by Alwéraje in Schifflange, this left-wing press provided a free source of information to workers.

From summer of the same year, Luxembourgers working in the Belgian Resistance started producing De freie Lötzeburger, 17 editions of which appeared between October 1941 and August 1942. Written and printed in Brussels, each edition was transported to Luxembourg for distribution.

Border crossings 
In localities close to the French and Belgian borders, the groups soon faced the problem of how to secretly cross the well-guarded border. Those wishing to leave the country included escaped prisoners of war, Allied pilots who had been shot down, or Resistance members wishing to travel to Britain to join the Allied armed forces, and this made an organised network necessary. Additionally, from 1943, the Resistance helped numerous young men who refused to serve in the Wehrmacht, to escape to France or Belgium. An estimated 2,000 people were helped across the border of Luxembourg, and several of the Resistance members lost their lives at these border crossings.

Intelligence and sabotage 
The Resistance members were aware of the value of intelligence for the British, who were for a while the only country resisting Nazi Germany. In spite of this, the beginnings of intelligence work in Luxembourg were difficult, but the Resistance attempted again and again to find ways to send information to the British.

Reports by doctor Fernand Schwachtgen, and signed "John the Blind", mostly reached London via the "Famille Martin" network, founded in Marseille by Walter Hamber, an Austrian Jew living in Luxembourg. These contained much information of great value, including information on V-1 and V-2 rocket testing sites in Peenemünde, which led to the Allies bombing these on the night of 17 August 1943.

From August 1942, the Luxembourgish businessman Edouard Hemmer, residing in Belgium, worked with Jean Fosty of the Belgian network Zéro to set up the intelligence network "Organisation Tod", or OT. OT gathered information from Luxembourg, which was then transmitted to London through Zéro. In late April 1943, Hemmer was arrested, and OT ceased its activity.

From autumn of 1943, Luxembourgish intelligence was started up again. It was primarily Josy Goerres who saw the importance of political, economic and military intelligence. His reports generally reached the government-in-exile via Belgium; others were transmitted through the hands of Dr Charles Marx, who had close contact with the French Resistance.

The Luxembourgish Resistance organised few acts of sabotage. In the steel plants, however, there was a "spirit of sabotage", which contributed to slowing the rate of production. Two acts of sabotage resulting in trail derailments were, however, organised at the initiative of Joseph Hittesdorf.

400 men from Luxembourg, many of whom had refused to serve in, or who had deserted from, the German Wehrmacht, fought in the French maquis, where they were particularly active in the regions of Lyon, Grenoble, and the Ardennes. Many were killed in the war. Others, like Antoine Diederich, rose to high rank in the Resistance. Diederich, known only as "Capitaine Baptiste", had 77 maquis soldiers under his command and is best known for attacking Riom prison, where he and his fighters freed 114 inmates who had been sentenced to death. Additionally around 300 men from Luxembourg left their country to fight in the Ardennes section of the Witte Brigade, where they formed the so-called Red Lion Brigade.

During the Battle of the Bulge most of the Luxembourgish Resistance members continued their engagement by helping the U.S. Forces during the battle. Shortly before however, Luxembourgish Resistance members fought alone in the only major open battle fought between the Luxembourgish Resistance against soldiers of the Waffen-SS during the Battle of Vianden.

Referendum and general strike 
Two of the Resistance's most notable feats were the referendum of 10 October 1941, and the general strike of September 1942.

The planned census of 1941 contained three questions on people's nationality, native language and ethnicity. The German authorities intended for Luxembourgers to answer "German" to all three questions, thus accepting their annexation by Nazi Germany: this essentially made it a referendum on German rule. The Resistance organisations spread awareness of the nature and significance of the upcoming census, and distributed leaflets strongly encouraging the population to answer Dräimol Letzebuerg ("three times Luxembourgish"). Initial results from straw polls showed that the population was following the Resistance's advice by an overwhelming majority, and the actual census on 10 October was cancelled, which was widely seen as a propaganda defeat for the Germans.

The 1942 general strike came about as a result of the introduction of conscription into the German military for young Luxembourgish males born between 1920 and 1927, announced on 30 August 1942.

Notable members

 Victor Abens
 Hans Adam
 Nicolas Bosseler
 Ady Claude
 Lucien Dury
 Joseph Dumong
 Georges Everling
 Vic Fischbach
 Jean-Pierre Glesener
 Josy Goerres
 Raymond Hagen
 Nicolas Huberty
 Yvo Kerger
 Louis Knaff
 Emile Krieps
 Eugène Léger
 Emile Maar
 Charles Marx
 Tony Noesen
 Wenzel Profant
 Aloyse Raths
 Charles Reiffers
 Jean-Pierre Ries
 Martin Scheeck
 Aloyse Schiltz
 René Schiltz
 Nicolas Schummer
 Pierre Schummer
 Fernand Schwachtgen
 Camille Sutor
 Marie-Louise Tidick-Ulveling
 Gordian Troeller
 Ernest Toussaint
 Lily Unden
 Albert Ungeheuer
 Madeleine Weis-Bauler
 Albert Wingert

See also

 1942 Luxembourgish general strike
 Battle of Vianden, the only major open battle fought between Luxembourgish resistance members and soldiers of the Waffen-SS
 German occupation of Luxembourg during World War II
 Luxembourgish collaboration with Nazi Germany
 Luxembourg in World War II
 National Resistance Museum, Luxembourg

References

Bibliography

Further reading
Blau, Lucien. La Résistance Au Grand-Duché De Luxembourg (1940-1945). Mémoire de Maitrise. Université de Metz, 1984.
 Candidi, Gino. La Résistance Du Peuple Luxembourgeois. Éditions du 'RAPPEL' (L.P.P.D.) (ed.). Luxembourg: Imprimerie Centrale, 1977.
 Dollar, Jacques: Josy Goerres et les PI-MEN dans la Résistance. Luxembourg, 1986.
 Dostert, Paul. "La Résistance luxembourgeoise pendant la seconde guerre mondiale et la reprise politique de 1944/45". In: Les Années Trente base de l'évolution économique, politique et sociale du Luxembourg d'après-guerre? Actes du Colloque de l'ALEH (27-28 octobre 1995). Supplement to Hémecht. Luxembourg: Editions St. Paul, 1996.
 Hilbert, Roger. "Resistenzbilder" in: De Mierscher Gemengebuet, Mersch, No. 70 (March 2005), p. 39-44
 Hoffmann, Serge. Le mouvement de résistance LVL au Luxembourg, Archives nationales, 2004
 Koch-Kent, Henri. Sie Boten Trotz: Luxemburger Im Freiheitskampf, 1939-1945. Luxembourg: Imprimerie Hermann, 1974.
Majerus, Benoît. "Le débat existe bel et bien ... A propos des actes du colloque 'Les courants politiques et la Résistance: continuités ou ruptures?'" In: forum, No. 227 (June 2003). p. 60-63
 Pauly, Michel. "Nichts Neues von den Luxemburger Resistenz-Historikern". In: forum, No. 216 (May 2003). p. 66
 Schoentgen, Marc. "Die Resistenzorganisationen in Luxemburg nach dem 2. Weltkrieg", in: Les courants politiques et la Résistance: Continuités ou ruptures?, Luxembourg, 2003, p. 519-551.
 Schoentgen, Marc. "Innenpolitische Konflikte und Erinnerungskultur in der Nachkriegszeit." In: forum, No. 251 (November 2005). p. 47-51
Stoffels, Jules. Petite histoire de l'activité des résistants luxembourgeois engagés dans les réseaux et les maquis de la France combattante, Association des anciens combattants volontaires luxembourgeois de la Résistance française. Luxembourg: Imprimerie Centrale, 2006.
 Weber, Paul. Geschichte Luxemburgs im Zweiten Weltkrieg. Luxembourg: Victor Buck, 1948.
 Wehenkel, Henri. "L'intérêt d'un colloque: Réflexions à propos du colloque d'Esch dur la Résistance". In: forum, No. 218 (July 2002). p. 47-49

External links 
 National Museum of Resistance in Esch-Alzette

World War II resistance movements
Luxembourg in World War II